Alksnis (feminine: Alksne) is a Latvian surname, derived from the Latvian word for "alder". Individuals with the surname include:
Gunnar Alksnis (1931–2011), Latvian-American philosopher and theologian
Viktor Alksnis (born 1950), Russian politician and former Soviet Air Force colonel of Latvian descent
Yakov Alksnis (1897–1938), commander of Red Army Air Forces from 1931 to 1937
Ādams Alksnis (1864–1897), Latvian painter

Latvian-language masculine surnames